Boruto: Naruto Next Generations is a Japanese anime series based on the manga series of the same name and is a spin-off of and sequel to Masashi Kishimoto's Naruto. It is produced by Pierrot and broadcast on TV Tokyo. The anime is directed by Masayuki Kōda (#105–281) and is written by Masaya Honda (#67–). Former manga writer Ukyō Kodachi supervised the story until episode 216.

Boruto follows the exploits of Naruto Uzumaki's son Boruto and his comrades from the Hidden Leaf Village's ninja academy while finding a path to follow once they grow up. Despite being based on the manga, the anime explores original storylines and adaptations of the spin-off manga, Naruto: The Seventh Hokage and the Scarlet Spring; Boruto: Naruto the Movie; as well as the Naruto Shinden light novel series.

It premiered on TV Tokyo on April 5, 2017, and aired every Wednesday at 5:55 PM JST. Starting May 3, 2018 (episode 56) it aired every Thursday at 7:25 PM JST. Starting October 7, 2018 (episode 76) it now airs every Sunday at 5:30 PM JST. The series is also being released in DVDs. Viz Media licensed the series on March 23, 2017, to simulcast it on Hulu, and on Crunchyroll.

The opening theme songs are "Hajimatteiku Takamatteiku" by Sambomaster (episodes 151–180), "Baku" by Ikimonogakari (episodes 181–205), and "Gamushara" by CHiCO with HoneyWorks (episodes 206–230).

The ending theme songs are "Maybe I" by Seven Billion Dots (episodes 151–167), "Central" by Ami Sakaguchi (episodes 168–180), "Answers" by Mol-74 (episodes 181–192), "Kimi ga Ita Shirushi" by halca (episodes 193–205), and "Who are you?" by PELICAN FANCLUB (episodes 206–218).


Episode list

Home releases

Japanese

English

Notes

References

Naruto episodes
Naruto lists